Judy Martin is a Jersey politician who was first elected as a Deputy for St Helier in the Jersey by-election of 2000.

She became an Assistant Minister for Health and Social Services in November 2011.

She was appointed Minister for Social Security in May 2018.

Political career

New police headquarters
Martin voiced opposition to the construction of a new HQ for the States of Jersey Police at the proposed Green Street car park site, suggesting it should be built elsewhere.

In 2021, Martin joined the newly formed Jersey Alliance party. She left the party in 2022.

References

Living people
Deputies of Jersey
Jersey women in politics
21st-century British women politicians
Year of birth missing (living people)
Government ministers of Jersey